The U.S. House Subcommittee on Oversight and Investigations is a subcommittee of the House Committee on Financial Services.

Jurisdiction
The Subcommittee conducts oversight of the agencies, departments, and programs under the Committee's jurisdiction. The Subcommittee also conducts investigations on any matter within the jurisdiction of the Committee, and evaluates the need for any legislative changes to the laws and programs within this jurisdiction.

Members, 117th Congress

Historical membership rosters

114th Congress

116th Congress

External links
Official Homepage

FinServe Oversight